Waseda Law School (）is the law school of Waseda University. It is among the top seven law schools that constituted the Leading Law School (LL7) along with the law schools of University of Tokyo, Kyoto University, Hitotsubashi University, Keio University, Chuo University, and Kobe University.

Basics 

 Established in 2004
 Dean: MATSUMURA, Kazunori (松村和徳)
 Degree conferred: Juris Doctor
 Semester starts every April
 Duration of the study: 3 years; 2 years for the accelerated program

Pass rate for bar exam
Waseda Law School (Graduate School of Law) was 9th out of all the 74 law schools in Japan according to the ratio, 63.95%, of the successful graduates who passed the bar examinations from 2007 to 2017 on average.

In 2020, Waseda Law School became 12th out of all the 72 law schools in Japan according to the ratio, 36.06%, of the successful graduates who passed the bar examination (national average : 39.16%).

References 

Waseda University
Law schools in Japan

External links